The Independent Reformed Presbyterian Church in Korea is a Presbyterian denomination in South Korea with 8 congregations and 600 members. It subscribes to the Westminster Confession of Faith. It has good relationship with the Independent Reformed Church in Korea.

References 

Presbyterian denominations in South Korea
Presbyterian denominations in Asia